Andagoya is a village in west-central Colombia. Andagoya is named for Pascual de Andagoya (1495–1548), a Spanish conquistador.

History
A cacique named Pocorosa lived in Andagoya in the 19th century. Pocorosa met the Spanish conquistadors.

Climate
Andagoya has one of the most monotonous climates in the world. This near complete uniformity of temperature is caused by the fact that Andagoya, at a latitude of 5°5' North, lies extremely close to the thermal equator, which is situated a few degrees north of the astronomical equator because the Earth reaches perihelion (its closest position to the Sun in its orbit) in early January and is at aphelion (furthest away) in early July, causing places located precisely at the equator to receive somewhat more insolation (i.e., light and heat energy from the sun) in January than in July even though the height of the sun and the length of days would be the same at both times. At a few degrees north latitude, however, the perihelion/aphelion factor and the slightly higher sun and longer days experienced at the time of the summer solstice for the Northern Hemisphere cancel each other out, making the level of insolation experienced there virtually identical throughout the year.

Every month of the year has at least  of average precipitation, with the wettest month (May) averaging .

References

Populated places in the Chocó Department